Henri Paret can refer to:

 Henri Paret (cyclist, born 1854), French cyclist who rode in the 1904 Tour de France
 Henri Paret (cyclist, born 1929), French cyclist who rode in the 1952 and 1953 Tour de France